Stanislav Konstantinovich Smirnov (born 3 September 1970) is a Russian mathematician currently working at the University of Geneva. He was awarded the Fields Medal in 2010. His research involves complex analysis, dynamical systems and probability theory.

Career
Smirnov's Ph.D. was conducted at Caltech under advisor Nikolai Makarov. In 1998 he was employed as part of the faculty at the Royal Institute of Technology in Stockholm, after which he took up his second position as a professor in the Analysis, Mathematical Physics and Probability group at the University of Geneva in 2003.

Research
Smirnov has worked on percolation theory, where he proved Cardy's formula for critical site percolation on the triangular lattice, and deduced conformal invariance. The conjecture was proved in the special case of site percolation on the triangular lattice. Smirnov's theorem has led to a fairly complete theory for percolation on the triangular lattice, and to its relationship to the Schramm–Loewner evolution introduced by Oded Schramm. He also established conformality for the two-dimensional critical Ising model.

Awards
Smirnov was  awarded the Saint Petersburg Mathematical Society Prize (1997), the Clay Research Award (2001), the Salem Prize (joint with Oded Schramm, 2001), the Göran Gustafsson Prize (2001), the Rollo Davidson Prize (2002), and the Prize of the European Mathematical Society (2004). In 2010 Smirnov was awarded the Fields medal for his work on the mathematical foundations of statistical physics, particularly finite lattice models. His citation read "for the proof of conformal invariance of percolation and the planar Ising model in statistical physics".

Publications
Probability and Statistical Physics in St. Petersburg, American Math Society, (2015)

References

External links

1970 births
20th-century Russian mathematicians
21st-century Russian mathematicians
Fields Medalists
Institute for Advanced Study visiting scholars
Academic staff of the University of Geneva
Probability theorists
International Mathematical Olympiad participants
Living people